Gu Xiong (顧敻) (fl. 10th century) was an official in the Five Dynasties and Ten Kingdoms period Former Shu (907–925) and Later Shu states (934–965). He was also a famous ci poet.

References

Former Shu poets
Later Shu poets
Former Shu politicians
Later Shu politicians
Later Tang people